The Delaunay tessellation field estimator (DTFE), (or Delone tessellation field estimator (DTFE)) is a mathematical tool for reconstructing a volume-covering and continuous density or intensity field from a discrete point set. The DTFE has various astrophysical applications, such as the analysis of  numerical simulations of cosmic structure formation, the mapping of the large-scale structure of the universe and improving computer simulation programs of cosmic structure formation. It has been developed by Willem Schaap and Rien van de Weijgaert. The main advantage of the DTFE is that it automatically adapts to (strong) variations in density and geometry. It is therefore very well suited for studies of the large scale galaxy distribution.

Method 

The DTFE consists of three main steps:

Step 1 

The starting point is a given discrete point
distribution. In the upper left-hand frame of the figure, a point distribution is plotted in which at the center of the frame an object is located whose density diminishes radially outwards. In the
first step of the DTFE, the Delaunay tessellation of the point
distribution is constructed. This is a volume-covering division
of space into triangles (tetrahedra in three dimensions), whose
vertices are formed by the point distribution (see figure, upper right-hand frame). The Delaunay tessellation is defined such
that inside the interior of the circumcircle of each Delaunay triangle 
no other points from the defining point distribution are present.

Step 2 

The Delaunay tessellation forms the heart of
the DTFE. In the figure it is clearly visible that the tessellation
automatically adapts to both the local density and geometry of the
point distribution: where the density is high, the triangles are small
and vice versa. The size of the triangles is therefore a measure of
the local density of the point distribution.
This property of the Delaunay tessellation is exploited in step 2 of
the DTFE, in which the local density is estimated at the locations of
the sampling points. For this purpose the density is defined at the
location of each sampling point as the inverse of the area of its
surrounding Delaunay triangles (times a normalization constant, see
figure, lower right-hand frame).

Step 3 

In step 3 these density estimates are interpolated to any other point,
by assuming that inside each Delaunay triangle the density field varies
linearly (see figure, lower left-hand frame).

Applications

An atlas of the nearby universe 

One of the main applications of the DTFE is the rendering of our cosmic neighborhood. 
Below the DTFE reconstruction of the 2dF Galaxy Redshift Survey is shown, revealing
an impressive view on the cosmic structures in the nearby universe. Several superclusters stand out, such as the Sloan Great Wall, one of the largest structures in the universe.

Numerical simulations of structure formation 

Most algorithms for simulating cosmic structure formation are 
particle hydrodynamics codes. At the core of these codes is the
smoothed particle hydrodynamics (SPH) density estimation procedure.
Replacing it by the DTFE density estimate will yield a major 
improvement for simulations incorporating feedback processes, 
which play a major role in galaxy and star formation.

Cosmic velocity field 

The DTFE has been designed for reconstructing density or intensity
fields from a discrete set of irregularly distributed points sampling
this field. However, it can also be used to
reconstruct other continuous fields which have been sampled at the
locations of these points, for example the cosmic velocity field. The use of the DTFE for this purpose has
the same advantages as it has for reconstructing density fields. The
fields are reconstructed locally without the application of an artificial or user-dependent smoothing procedure, resulting in an optimal resolution and the suppression of shot noise effects. The
estimated quantities are volume-covering and allow for a direct
comparison with theoretical predictions.

Evolution and dynamics of the cosmic web 

The DTFE has been specifically designed for describing the
complex properties of the cosmic web. It can therefore be used to study the evolution of voids and superclusters in the large scale matter galaxy distribution.

External links 
 DTFE: the Delaunay Tessellation Field Estimator, Willem Schaap, 2007, PhD Thesis, Rijksuniversiteit Groningen, The Netherlands
 
 Probing cosmic velocity flows in the local universe, Emilio Romano-Diaz, 2004, PhD Thesis, Rijksuniversiteit Groningen, The Netherlands
 The cosmic web: geometric analysis, Rien van de Weygaert and Willem Schaap, 2004

Large-scale structure of the cosmos
Cosmological simulation
Astronomical surveys
Geometric algorithms